Paris Encounter is an album by vibraphonist Gary Burton and violinist Stéphane Grappelli recorded in 1969 and released on the Atlantic label.

Reception 
The Allmusic review by Scott Yanow stated: "both Grappelli and Burton prove to be flexible enough to have much common ground despite a 35-year difference in age. A frequently delightful set".

Track listing
 "Daphné" (Django Reinhardt) - 4:08 
 "Blue in Green" (Miles Davis, Bill Evans) - 3:39 
 "Falling Grace" (Steve Swallow) - 3:14 
 "Here's That Rainy Day" (Johnny Burke, Jimmy Van Heusen) - 5:28 
 "Coquette" (Carmen Lombardo, Gus Kahn, Johnny Green) - 3:57 
 "Sweet Rain" (Michael Gibbs) - 3:40 
 "The Night Has a Thousand Eyes" (Buddy Bernier, Jerry Brainin) - 3:43 
 "Arpege" (Stéphane Grappelli) - 3:23 
 "Eiderdown" (Swallow) - 4:13
Recorded at Studios Europe Sonor, Paris, France on November 4, 1969.

Personnel 
Musicians
 Gary Burton — vibraphone
 Stéphane Grappelli — violin 
 Steve Swallow — electric bass
 Bill Goodwin — drums

Production
 Jean-Louis Ginibre – producer
 Charles Raucher – engineer
 Haig Adishian – design
 Guy Le Querrec – photography

References 

Atlantic Records albums
Gary Burton albums
1972 albums